This is a list of cancelled military projects.

Argentina

Fuerza Aérea Argentina 

 FMA I.Ae. 27 Pulqui I
 FMA I.Ae. 37
 FMA I.Ae. 48
 FMA IA 62
 FMA IAe 33 Pulqui II
 FMA SAIA 90
 I.Ae. 30 Ñancú
 Condor (Argentine missile)

Australia

Royal Australian Navy
Attack-class submarine
Australian light destroyer project
Kaman SH-2G(A) Super Seasprite

Australian Army
LCM2000-class landing craft mechanised
Landing Ship Medium Mark II
Project Waler

Royal Australian Air Force
AAC Wamira
CAC CA-15
CAC CA-23
CAC Woomera

Brazil

Exército Brasileiro 
EE-T1 Osório

Brazilian Air Force 

 Baumgartl PB-60

 CBT BQM-1BR
 CTA Convertiplano

Canada

Pre-Unification

Canadian Army 
Velvet Glove
Bobcat (armoured personnel carrier) (1952–1963)

Royal Canadian Air Force

Fighters
Avro Canada CF-103 (1950–1951)
Avro Canada CF-105 Arrow (1953–1959)

Missiles
Velvet Glove AAM (1953–1956)

Royal Canadian Navy 

 General Purpose Frigate (Canada)
 Polar 8 Project
 Bras d'Or class (1960–1971)
 Canada-class submarine (1987-1989)

Canadian Forces

Land Forces
Multi-Mission Effects Vehicle (2005–2007)

Czechoslovakia/Czech Republic

Vzdušné síly Armády 
Aero A.24

Egypt

Egyptian Air Force 

 Helwan HA-300

France

French Army 

 FCM 50t
 AMX-50
 Lorraine 40t

French Navy 

 Alsace-class battleship
 Joffre-class aircraft carrier
 PH 75
 French aircraft carrier PA2

French Air Force 

 Aero A.24
 Latécoère 550
 ANF Les Mureaux 120
 ANF Les Mureaux 170
 ANF Les Mureaux 180
 ANF Les Mureaux 190
 Arsenal VG 90
 Nord 2200
 Sud-Ouest Espadon
 SNCASO Trident
 SNCASE SE.212 Durandal
 Dassault Hirondelle
 BAC/Dassault AFVG
 Dassault Mirage G
 Dassault Mirage 4000

Germany

Military of the German Empire

Imperial German Navy 

 German aircraft carrier I (1915) 
 Ersatz Yorck-class battlecruiser
 Mackensen-class battlecruiser

Wehrmacht

Heer 

 Landkreuzer P. 1000 Ratte

Kriegsmarine 

 H-class battleship proposals
 O-class battlecruiser
 Graf Zeppelin-class aircraft carrier
 Jade-class aircraft carrier

Luftwaffe 

 Ural bomber
 Amerikabomber

 AEG helicopter
 Albatros D.IV
 Arado Ar 198
 Arado E.560
 Arado E.340
 Arado E.381
 Arado E.555
 Arado E.583
 Argus Fernfeuer

 Blohm & Voss P 196
 Blohm & Voss P 197
 Blohm & Voss P 204
 Blohm & Voss P 211
 Blohm & Voss P 214
 Blohm & Voss P 163
 Blohm & Voss P 170
 Blohm & Voss P 178
 Blohm & Voss P 184
 Blohm & Voss P 192
 Blohm & Voss P 193
 Blohm & Voss P 198
 Blohm & Voss P 203
 Blohm & Voss P 208
 Blohm & Voss P 209
 Blohm & Voss P 212
 Blohm & Voss P 213
 Blohm & Voss P 215
 Blohm & Voss P.202

 DFS 228
 Dornier Do 13
 Dornier Do 19
 Dornier Do 29 (1934)
 Dornier Do 31
 Dornier Do 32
 Dornier Do 214
 Dornier Do 231
 Dornier Do 317
 Dornier Do 417
 Dornier Do 635
 Dornier P 256

 Emergency Fighter Program
 EWR VJ 101

 Fieseler Fi 157
 Fieseler Fi 166
 Fieseler Fi 168
 Fieseler Fi 333
 Focke Rochen
 Focke-Achgelis Fa 269
 Focke-Achgelis Fa 284
 Focke-Wulf Flitzer
 Focke-Wulf Fw 42
 Focke-Wulf Fw 57
 Focke-Wulf Fw 300
 Focke-Wulf Project I
 Focke-Wulf Project II
 Focke-Wulf Project VIII
 Focke-Wulf Super Lorin
 Focke-Wulf Ta 153
 Focke-Wulf Ta 154 Moskito
 Focke-Wulf Ta 183
 Focke-Wulf Ta 254
 Focke-Wulf Ta 283
 Focke-Wulf Ta 400
 Focke-Wulf Triebflügel
 Focke-Wulf Volksjäger

 Heinkel He 119
 Heinkel He 277
 Heinkel He 343
 Heinkel He 519
 Heinkel Lerche
 Heinkel P.1073
 Heinkel P.1078
 Heinkel Wespe
 Henschel Hs 127
 Henschel Hs 130
 Horten H.XVIII

 Junkers Ju 89
 Junkers Ju 268
 Junkers Ju 288
 Junkers Ju 390

 Lippisch Delta VI
 Lippisch P.13
 Lippisch P.13a
 Lippisch P.15
 Lippisch P.20

 MBB Lampyridae
 Messerschmitt Bf 109TL
 Messerschmitt Bf 162
 Messerschmitt Me 261
 Messerschmitt Me 264
 Messerschmitt Me 265
 Messerschmitt Me 310
 Messerschmitt Me 328
 Messerschmitt Me 329
 Messerschmitt Me 509
 Messerschmitt Me 609
 Messerschmitt P.1079
 Messerschmitt P.1099
 Messerschmitt P.1103
 Messerschmitt P.1106
 Messerschmitt P.1108
 Messerschmitt P.1110
 Messerschmitt P.1111
 Messerschmitt P.1112

 Škoda-Kauba P14
 Sombold So 344

 VFW VAK 191B

 Zeppelin Fliegende Panzerfaust
 Zeppelin Rammer
 ZSO 523

Other 

 German nuclear weapons program

Bundeswehr

German Army 

 MBT-70
 VT tank

German Air Force 
EWR VJ 101
VFW VAK 191B
MBB Lampyridae
Dornier Viper

India

Indian Air Force 
 HAL HF-73

Iraq 

 Project Babylon

Israel

Israel Defense Forces

Aviation
IAI Lavi
IAI Nammer

Italy

Regia Marina/Italian Navy 

 Francesco Caracciolo-class battleship

Regia Aeronautica/Italian Air Force 

 Fiat BGA
 IMAM Ro.51
 Caproni Ca.165
 Caproni Ca.335
 Savoia-Marchetti SM.88
 Caproni Ca.350
 Caproni Ca.355
 Caproni Ca.356
 Piaggio P.119
 Savoia-Marchetti SM.89
 Savoia-Marchetti SM.91
 Savoia-Marchetti SM.92
 Savoia-Marchetti SM.105
 Fiat G.80
 Aerfer Ariete

Other 

 Italian nuclear weapons program

Japan

Imperial Japanese Armed Forces

Imperial Japanese Navy 

 Design A-150 battleship

Pakistan

Pakistan Air Force 

 Project Sabre II

Poland

Polish Air Force
PZL-230 Skorpion

Polish Navy
Gawron-class corvette*

Romania

Romanian Air Force 

 IAR 95

Other 

 Danube Program

Russia/Soviet Union

Soviet Armed Forces

Red Army/Soviet Army 

 Hovercraft tank
 Anti-tank dog
 T-42 super-heavy tank
 SMK tank
 T-43 medium tank
 T-100 tank
 KV-13
 SU-14
 SU-100P
 SU-100Y
 RPG-1
 Uralmash-1
 Obiekt 140
 Obiekt 187
 Obiekt 279
 Obiekt 292
 Obiekt 416
 Obiekt 490
 Obiekt 490A
 Obiekt 770
 Obiekt 775
 Obiekt 785
 2B1 Oka
 Kh-45
 2A3 Kondensator 2P
 SU-152 "Taran"
 SU-152G
 S-51 Self-Propelled Gun
 1K17 Szhatie
 2S15 Norov
 Soviet laser pistol

Soviet Navy 

 Sovetsky Soyuz-class battleship
 Kiev-class destroyer
 Kronshtadt-class battlecruiser
 Stalingrad-class battlecruiser
 Soviet aircraft carrier Riga
 Soviet aircraft carrier Ulyanovsk
 Project 1231
 Project 1153 Orel
 Project 11780

Strategic Rocket Forces 

 Global Rocket 1
 Burya
 R-46 (missile)

Soviet Air Force 

 Alekseyev I-21
 Alekseyev I-212
 Antonov A-40
 Ayaks
 Bartini Beriev VVA-14

 Belyayev DB-LK
 Beriev S-13
 Bratukhin B-5
 Bratukhin B-11
 Bratukhin Omega

 Chyetverikov SPL
 Chyetverikov TA

 EKIP

 Ilyushin I-21
 Ilyushin Il-1
 Ilyushin Il-6
 Ilyushin Il-8
 Ilyushin Il-16
 Ilyushin Il-20 (1948)
 Ilyushin Il-22
 Ilyushin Il-26
 Ilyushin Il-30
 Ilyushin Il-32
 Ilyushin Il-40
 Ilyushin Il-46
 Ilyushin Il-54
 Ilyushin Il-90
 Ilyushin Il-102
 Ilyushin Il-106

 Kalinin K-7
 Kamov V-50
 Kamov V-80
 Kamov V-100

 Lavochkin La-150
 Lavochkin La-168
 Lavochkin La-190
 Lavochkin La-200
 Lavochkin La-250

 Mikoyan MiG-33
 Mikoyan Project 1.44
 Mikoyan-Gurevich DIS
 Mikoyan-Gurevich I-3
 Mikoyan-Gurevich I-7
 Mikoyan-Gurevich I-75
 Mikoyan-Gurevich I-211
 Mikoyan-Gurevich I-250
 Mikoyan-Gurevich I-270
 Mikoyan-Gurevich I-320
 Mikoyan-Gurevich I-350
 Mikoyan-Gurevich MiG-6
 Mikoyan-Gurevich Ye-8
 Mikoyan-Gurevich Ye-150 family
 Mil Mi-36
 Mil Mi-42
 Mil V-5
 Mil V-7
 Mil V-16
 Moscow Aviation Institute BB-MAI
 Moskalyev SAM-13
 Myasishchev M-18
 Myasishchev M-50

 OKB-1 140
 OKB-1 150

 Polikarpov NB
 Polikarpov SPB (D)
 Polikarpov VIT-1
 Polikarpov VIT-2
 Post-PFI Soviet/Russian aircraft projects
 Putilov Stal-11

 Sukhoi P-1
 Sukhoi Shkval
 Sukhoi Su-1
 Sukhoi Su-5
 Sukhoi Su-6
 Sukhoi Su-9 (1946)
 Sukhoi Su-10
 Sukhoi Su-12
 Sukhoi Su-15 (1949)
 Sukhoi Su-17 (1949)
 Sukhoi T-3
 Sukhoi T-4
 Sukhoi T-49
 Sukhoi T-60S

 Tairov OKO-7
 Tsybin RSR
 Tupolev ANT-16
 Tupolev ANT-30
 Tupolev DB-1
 Tupolev Samolyot 135
 Tupolev TB-6
 Tupolev Tu-75
 Tupolev Tu-80
 Tupolev Tu-95LAL
 Tupolev Tu-107
 Tupolev Tu-125
 Tupolev Tu-360
 Tupolev Voron

 Yakovlev VVP-6
 Yakovlev Yak-8
 Yakovlev Yak-16
 Yakovlev Yak-25 (1947)
 Yakovlev Yak-30 (1948)
 Yakovlev Yak-30 (1960)
 Yakovlev Yak-32
 Yakovlev Yak-33
 Yakovlev Yak-35
 Yakovlev Yak-43
 Yakovlev Yak-44
 Yakovlev Yak-45
 Yakovlev Yak-50 (1949)
 Yakovlev Yak-60
 Yakovlev Yak-100
 Yakovlev Yak-140
 Yakovlev Yak-141
 Yakovlev Yak-200
 Yakovlev Yak-1000

 Zveno project

Russian Armed Forces

Russian Ground Forces 
Object 640

Russian Air Forces 
MiG 1.44

South Korea 

 South Korean nuclear weapons project

Sweden

Swedish Air Force 

 Saab 36
 Saab 38

Other 

 Swedish nuclear weapons program

United Kingdom

British Army 
BSA Welgun
Elkins Automatic Rifle
EM-2 rifle
Farquhar-Hill rifle
FN FAL Bullpup .280
Howard Francis machine carbine
L64/65
Sterling SAR-87

Royal Air Force 
Armstrong Whitworth AW.681
Avro 730
BAC TSR-2
BAE Systems Nimrod MRA4
British Aerospace Nimrod AEW.3
British Aerospace P.125
Hawker P.1103
Hawker P.1121
Hawker Siddeley P.1154
Vickers Type 559

Royal Navy 
 CVA-01
 Hawker Siddeley P.139B
 Lion-class battleship
 Malta-class aircraft carrier
 Type 43 destroyer
 Type 82 destroyer
 Project Habakkuk

United States

United States Army Air Corps

Bombers
Huff-Daland XB-1
Douglas Y1B-7
Fokker XB-8
Boeing Y1B-9
Douglas YB-11
Martin XB-13
Martin XB-14
Boeing XB-15
Martin XB-16
Douglas XB-19
Boeing Y1B-20
North American XB-21
Douglas XB-22
Martin XB-27
North American XB-28

Fighters
Douglas XP-48
Lockheed XP-49
Grumman XP-50

United States Army Air Forces

Bombers
Lockheed XB-30
Douglas XB-31
Consolidated B-32 Dominator
Martin XB-33 Super Marauder
Boeing YB-40 Flying Fortress Gunship
Consolidated XB-41 Liberator Gunship

Fighters
Vultee XP-54
Curtiss XP-55 Ascender
Northrop XP-56 Black Bullet
Lockheed XP-58 Chain Lightning
Lockheed L-133 Starjet
Bell P-59 Airacomet
Curtiss XP-62
McDonnell XP-67 Bat
Republic XP-72
Fisher (General Motors) P-75 Eagle
Bell XP-76
Northrop XP-79
Convair XP-81
Bell XP-83

United States Air Force

Bombers
XB-35
YB-49
XB-70 Valkyrie
B-1A
FICON project
 B-72 (WS-125)
Convair X-6
Aircraft Nuclear Propulsion

Fighters
Northrop YA-9
Lockheed YF-12
Republic XF-103
North American F-107
XF-108 Rapier
Bell XF-109
Northrop F-20 Tigershark
Northrop YF-23

Other
Project Pluto
Supersonic Low Altitude Missile
BGM-75 AICBM
WS-124A Flying Cloud
Blue Gemini
Manned Orbiting Laboratory
Peacekeeper Rail Garrison
Safeguard Program

United States Navy/United States Marine Corps 

 Electronic laser

Attack Aircraft
 Douglas A2D Skyshark
 North American A2J Super Savage
 McDonnell Douglas A-12 Avenger II

Fighters
 Grumman XF5F Skyrocket
 Goodyear F2G
 Douglas F6D Missileer
 Grumman XF10F Jaguar
 General Dynamics F-111B
 Convair F2Y Sea Dart

Rotorcraft
 Lockheed Martin VH-71 Kestrel

Ships
 Aircraft Carrier (Medium)
 CG(X)
 
 
 Sea Control Ship
 Strike Cruiser
  battleship

United States Army

Small arms

Model 45A
Gyrojet Assault Rifle
Olin/Winchester Salvo Rifle
Thompson Carbine
Heckler & Koch XM8
Heckler & Koch XM29 OICW
Heckler & Koch HK CAWS
Special Purpose Individual Weapon
Heckler & Koch G11

Armor
MBT-70
Future Combat Systems

Artillery

XM2001 Crusader
M247 Sergeant York

Aviation
AH-56 Cheyenne
Boeing Vertol YUH-61
Boeing Vertol XCH-62
RAH-66 Comanche
Bell ARH-70

Other
Project Iceworm

United States Department of Defense
Project Camelot

Yugoslavia

Yugoslav Air Force 

 Novi Avion

References

Cancelled aircraft projects